This is a list of French television related events from 1983.

Events
20 March - Guy Bonnet is selected to represent France at the 1983 Eurovision Song Contest with his song "Vivre". He is selected to be the twenty-sixth French Eurovision entry during a national final.

Debuts

Yakari - 13 September

Television shows
1940sLe Jour du Seigneur (1949–present)

1950sPrésence protestante (1955-)

1960sLes Dossiers de l'écran (1967-1991)Les Animaux du monde (1969-1990)Alain Decaux raconte (1969-1987)

1970s30 millions d'amis (1976-2016)Les Jeux de 20 Heures (1976-1987)

1980s
Dimanche MartinJulien Fontanes, magistrat (1980-1989)Mardi Cinéma '' (1982-1988)

Ending this year

Télé-Philatélie

Births

Deaths

Denise Glaser

References

See also
1983 in France
List of French films of 1983